This is a list of the number-one hits of 1999 on Italian Hit Parade Singles Chart.

References

1999
One
1999 record charts